Jean-Claude Letzelter (born 20 September 1940) is a French chess FIDE Master (FM) and three times French Chess Championship winner (1968, 1971, 1974).

Biography
From the mid-1960s to the late 1970s, Jean-Claude Letzelter was one of the best French chess players. He played in individual French Chess Championship finals many times, winning three gold medals (1968, 1971, 1974) and a silver medal (1967). In 1975, in Vratsa, he participated in the World Chess Championship Zonal tournament and ranked 16th.

Jean-Claude Letzelter played for France in the Chess Olympiads:
 In 1968, at the second board in the 18th Chess Olympiad in Lugano (+5, =4, -4),
 In 1972, at the third board in the 20th Chess Olympiad in Skopje (+8, =3, -4),
 In 1976, at the second reserve board in the 22nd Chess Olympiad in Haifa (+5, =2, -4),
 In 1978, at the second reserve board in the 23rd Chess Olympiad in Buenos Aires (+3, =2, -3).

Jean-Claude Letzelter played for France in the European Team Chess Championship preliminaries:
 In 1977, at the second board in the 6th European Team Chess Championship preliminaries (+2, =0, -0).

References

External links
 
 
 
 {{365Chess.com player|Jean_Claude_Letzelter Jean-Claude Letzelter] chess games at 365chess.com

1940 births
Living people
French chess players
Chess FIDE Masters
Chess Olympiad competitors
People from Sélestat
Sportspeople from Bas-Rhin